Dolniak is a surname. Its origin is Slavic, meaning "valley dweller." Its counterpart, Hornyak, means "mountain dweller." Notable people with the surname include:

 Barbara Dolniak (born 1960), Polish politician, wife of Grzegorz
 Grzegorz Dolniak (1960–2010), Polish politician

See also
 

Polish-language surnames